Billy Joe Maxwell (July 23, 1929 – September 20, 2021) was an American professional golfer.

Maxwell was born in Abilene, Texas. He played college golf at North Texas State College and helped them win four consecutive NCAA Division I team championships (1949–1952). Maxwell also won the U.S. Amateur title in 1951. After an impressive amateur career, he served in the Army and turned pro in 1954.

Maxwell won seven times on the PGA Tour. He also played on the 1963 Ryder Cup team and was elected to the Texas Golf Hall of Fame. He has a twin brother, Bobby, who was also a golfer. He resided in Jacksonville, Florida where, along with former PGA touring pro, Chris Blocker, he owned and operated Hyde Park Golf Club, a Donald Ross designed course.

Amateur wins
This list is probably incomplete
1951 U.S. Amateur
1953 Mexican Amateur

Professional wins (10)

PGA Tour wins (7)

PGA Tour playoff record (1–2)

Other wins (3)
this list is probably incomplete
1956 Mexican Open
1961 Puerto Rico Open
1973 Florida Open

Major championships

Amateur wins (1)

Results timeline
Amateur

Professional

Note: Maxwell never played in The Open Championship.

WD = withdrew
"T" indicates a tie for a place
R256, R128, R64, R32, R16, QF, SF = Round in which player lost in match play

Sources: Masters, U.S. Open and U.S. Amateur, PGA Championship, 1952 British Amateur

Summary

Most consecutive cuts made – 14 (1963 Masters – 1971 PGA)
Longest streak of top-10s – 2 (three times)

U.S. national team appearances
Professional
Ryder Cup: 1963 (winners)

References

External links

American male golfers
North Texas Mean Green men's golfers
PGA Tour golfers
PGA Tour Champions golfers
Ryder Cup competitors for the United States
Golfers from Texas
Golfers from Jacksonville, Florida
United States Army soldiers
Sportspeople from Abilene, Texas
1929 births
2021 deaths